The 1945–46 Nationalliga A season was the eighth season of the Nationalliga A, the top level of ice hockey in Switzerland. Seven teams participated in the league, and HC Davos won the championship.

Standings

External links
 Championnat de Suisse 1945/46

Swiss
National League (ice hockey) seasons
1945–46 in Swiss ice hockey